The 2002 Wales rugby union tour of South Africa was a series of matches played in June 2002 in South Africa by Wales national rugby union team.

Only two test matches were played; Wales lost both.

First test
In the first test, Wales led after the first 20 minutes, but tries from Marius Joubert and Bobby Skinstad gave the first advantage (15-11) for the victorious Springboks.

Second Test
Wales again lost, but played a "fiercely contested" match according to BBC Sport. The tour showed the improvement that the coach Steve Hansen was waiting for.

References

2002 rugby union tours
2001–02 in Welsh rugby union
2002
2002 in South African rugby union
2002
History of rugby union matches between South Africa and Wales